Ludogorie Peak is a peak rising to 350 m in Friesland Ridge, Tangra Mountains in eastern Livingston Island, South Shetland Islands in Antarctica.  The peak overlooks Prespa Glacier to the west and south, Macy Glacier to the northeast, and Brunow Bay to the east, and is named after Ludogorie region in northeastern Bulgaria.

Location

Maps
 L.L. Ivanov et al. Antarctica: Livingston Island and Greenwich Island, South Shetland Islands. Scale 1:100000 topographic map. Sofia: Antarctic Place-names Commission of Bulgaria, 2005.
 L.L. Ivanov. Antarctica: Livingston Island and Greenwich, Robert, Snow and Smith Islands. Scale 1:120000 topographic map.  Troyan: Manfred Wörner Foundation, 2009.

References
 Ludogorie Peak. SCAR Composite Gazetteer of Antarctica
 Bulgarian Antarctic Gazetteer. Antarctic Place-names Commission. (details in Bulgarian, basic data in English)

External links
 Ludogorie Peak. Copernix satellite image

Tangra Mountains